The PAGASA Planetarium is a planetarium within the grounds of the PAGASA Science Garden situated along Agham Road in Quezon City, Metro Manila, Philippines. It is operated and owned by the Philippine Atmospheric, Geophysical and Astronomical Services Administration (PAGASA).

The planetarium was built in September 1977. The facility is managed by PAGASA's Astronomy Research and Development Section (AsRDS) and Atmospheric, Geophysical and Space Sciences Branch (AGSSB). The planetarium has a maximum capacity of 100 people.

In 1999, the AsRDS acquired a mobile planetarium which can be transported in areas outside Manila upon request. The mobile planetarium has a maximum capacity of 50 people.

Minor renovations were done in 2005 which includes the replacement of chairs which were in poor condition.

See also
National Planetarium (Manila)

References

Planetaria in the Philippines
Buildings and structures in Quezon City
Buildings and structures completed in 1977
Museums in Quezon City
Tourist attractions in Quezon City
PAGASA